Tiquipaya Municipality is the third municipal section of the Quillacollo Province in the Cochabamba Department, Bolivia. Its seat is Tiquipaya.

Cantons 
The municipality consists of only one canton, Tiquipaya Canton. It is identical to the municipality.

See also 
 Sayt'u Qucha

References 

  Instituto Nacional de Estadistica de Bolivia  (INE)

Municipalities of the Cochabamba Department